Fits of Gloom was an Italian music project, active in the 1990s. They had a 1994 hit with "Heaven", which reached No. 47 on the UK Singles Chart and a No. 49 hit with their version of "The Power of Love" featuring British singer Lizzy Mack.

References

Italian Eurodance groups
MCA Records artists